The Nigerian Open was a golf tournament in Nigeria, played between 1969 and 1999. It was generally played at the Ikoyi Club in Ikoyi, Lagos. From 1997 to 1999 it was played at the IBB International Golf & Country Club in Abuja. It was an fixture on the Safari Circuit until 1993, and also a Challenge Tour event between 1990 and 1993.

In 1981, England's Peter Tupling set the record low 72 hole score in professional tournament golf, when he won the title with a 29 under par total of 255. Notable past champions include major winners Vijay Singh and Sandy Lyle and former Ryder Cup player Gordon J. Brand.

Winners

Notes

References

Former Challenge Tour events
Safari Circuit events
Golf in Nigeria
Recurring sporting events established in 1969
Recurring sporting events disestablished in 1999
1969 establishments in Nigeria
1999 disestablishments in Nigeria